PANA  may refer to:

 The Panafrican News Agency, based in Senegal
 A former name of the Islamic Republic News Agency, based in Iran
 The Protocol for carrying Authentication for Network Access
 PANA in telecommunications refers to a plain analog loop, also known as a dry pair or BANA (basic analog loop)
 Napakiak Airport (ICAO location indicator: PANA), in Napakiak, Alaska, United States

See also
 Pana (disambiguation)